"State Sponsors of Terrorism" is a designation applied by the United States Department of State to countries which the Department alleges to have "repeatedly provided support for acts of international terrorism". Inclusion on the list imposes strict unilateral sanctions.
The State Department is required to maintain the list under section 1754(c) of the National Defense Authorization Act for Fiscal Year 2019, section 40 of the Arms Export Control Act, and section 620A of the Foreign Assistance Act.
, the list consists of Cuba, Iran, North Korea, and Syria. Countries formerly on the list were Iraq, Libya, South Yemen, and Sudan.

Timeline

Countries currently on the list

Cuba
Cuba was added to the list on March 1, 1982, on the basis that it has a history of supporting revolutionary movements in Spanish-speaking countries and Africa.Havana openly advocates armed revolution as the only means for leftist forces to gain power in Latin America, and the Cubans have played an important role in facilitating the movement of men and weapons into the region. Havana provides direct support in the form of training, arms, safe havens, and advice to a wide variety of guerrilla groups. Many of these groups engage in terrorist operations.Cuba "encouraged terrorism in the hope of provoking indiscriminate violence and repression, in order to weaken government legitimacy and attract new converts to armed struggle." In 1992, after the Soviet collapse, Fidel Castro stressed that his country's support for insurgents abroad was a thing of the past.

According to Country Reports on Terrorism 2010: August 18, 2011:

On December 17, 2014, an agreement to restore relations with Cuba was reached; the President instructed the Secretary of State to immediately launch a review of Cuba's inclusion on the list, and provide a report to the President within six months regarding Cuba's alleged support for international terrorism. President Barack Obama announced on April 14, 2015, that Cuba was being removed from the list. Cuba would not come off the list until after a 45-day review period, during which the U.S. Congress could try blocking Cuba's removal via a joint resolution. Congress did not act, and Cuba was officially removed from the list on May 29, 2015.

Cuba was readded to the list on January 12, 2021, with Secretary of State Mike Pompeo citing "repeatedly providing support for acts of international terrorism" by harboring U.S. fugitives as well as Colombian rebel leaders. Cuba's support for Nicolás Maduro in the presidential crisis alleging the Maduro administration created "a permissive environment for international terrorists to live and thrive within Venezuela" was another reason for the redesignation. The redesignation came just eight days before Donald Trump's presidency ended on January 20 at noon.

Iran
Iran was added to the list on January 19, 1984. According to Country Reports on Terrorism 2013:

Mike Pompeo issued an official statement as the US Secretary of State on 12 January 2021, stating, "al-Qaeda has a new home base: it is the Islamic Republic of Iran."

North Korea
North Korea was added in 1988, following the 1987 bombing of Korean Air Flight 858 near Myanmar and re-listed again in 2017.

On June 26, 2008, President George W. Bush announced that he would remove North Korea from the list. On October 11, the country was officially removed from the list for meeting all nuclear inspection requirements.

North Korea was initially added because it sold weapons to terrorist groups and gave asylum to Japanese Communist League-Red Army Faction members. The country is also responsible for the Rangoon bombing.

According to Country Reports on Terrorism: April 30, 2007:

Terrorology specialist Gus Martin writes in his Understanding Terrorism: Challenges, perspectives and issues that "it is important to note that the State Department's list includes countries that have significantly reduced their involvement in terrorism, such as North Korea and Cuba. For example, North Korea was at one time quite active in attacking South Korean interests. In November 1987, North Korean operatives apparently destroyed Korean Airlines Flight 858, which exploded in Myanmar (Burma). The North Korean government has since renounced its sponsorship of terrorism."

The U.S State Department said it made the decision as Pyongyang had agreed to the verification of all of its nuclear programs, etc.

On April 13, 2008, Pyongyang agreed to dismantle the Yongbyon facility as part of an aid-for-disarmament deal, and in response, the U.S. removed North Korea from its terrorism blacklist. Despite requests from the South Korean government to put North Korea back on the list after it sank the Navy ship the ROKS Cheonan in 2010, the Obama administration stated that it would not do so because the act was conducted by only the North Korean military and was thus not an act of terror. However, following the incident, the Obama administration also stated that it would then closely monitor North Korea for signs for a return to international terrorism. U.S. State Department spokesman P.J Crowley also said that returning North Korea to the list was under continual review.

Former Secretary of State Hillary Clinton stated that she was considering renaming North Korea on the List of State Sponsors of Terrorism. As of 2016, North Korea, unlike the other countries removed and the designated state sponsor of terrorism Sudan, was still listed as not fully cooperating with the United States to reduce terrorism.

In February 2017, following the alleged state-sponsored murder of Kim Jong-nam (Supreme Leader Kim Jong-un's half-brother) using the VX (banned under the international Chemical Weapons Convention, a convention which the North Korean government has not signed), pressure was placed on the Trump administration to revoke Bush's lifting of sanctions. In April 2017, U.S. Congress backed a bill to reinstate North Korea as a state sponsor of terror following the 2017 Shayrat missile strike in Syria, which North Korea had condemned vehemently. In August of the same year, the nation launched a missile that flew over Hokkaido, Japan, promoting severe condemnation from other states. In September, the parents of Otto Warmbier, who had died after being imprisoned in the nation, stated that they want North Korea to be relisted for his apparent murder.
On November 20, 2017, President Trump officially announced the re-listing of North Korea as a state sponsor of terrorism.

Syria
Syria was added to the list on December 29, 1979. It is the only country from the original 1979 list to remain on the list, following Libya's removal in 2006.
According to Country Reports on Terrorism 2013:

Countries whose inclusion in the list is being discussed

Russia
In May 2022, Senators Richard Blumenthal (D-CT) and Lindsey Graham (R-SC) announced the introduction of the resolution calling on the Biden administration to designate Russia as a state sponsor of terrorism for its war on Ukraine and conduct elsewhere under Vladimir Putin. "Putin is a terrorist, and one of the most disruptive forces on the planet is Putin's Russia," said Graham, introducing the resolution.

Countries that have been removed

Iraq (1979–1982, 1990–2004) 
Iraq was added to the list on December 29, 1979, but was removed in February 1982 to allow US aid to Iraq while it was fighting Iran in the Iran–Iraq War. It was re-added on September 13, 1990, following its Invasion of Kuwait. The State Department's reason for including Iraq was that it provided bases to the Mujahedin-e-Khalq (MEK), the Kurdistan Workers Party (PKK), the Palestine Liberation Front (PLF), and the Abu Nidal organization (ANO). It was again removed following the 2003 US-led invasion and the overthrow of the government of Saddam Hussein. Following the invasion, US sanctions applicable to "state sponsors of terrorism" against Iraq were suspended on May 7, 2003, and Iraq was removed from the list on October 20, 2004.

Libya (1979–2006) 
Libya was added on December 29, 1979. Then under the rule of Muammar Gaddafi, it was branded a sponsor of terrorism due to its support for several left-wing militant groups, such as the Provisional Irish Republican Army, the Basque Fatherland and Liberty, the Umkhonto We Sizwe, the Polisario Front, the Kurdistan Workers' Party, the Túpac Amaru Revolutionary Movement, the Palestine Liberation Organization, Popular Front for the Liberation of Palestine, Free Aceh Movement, Free Papua Movement, Fretilin, Kanak and Socialist National Liberation Front, Republic of South Maluku and the Moro National Liberation Front of the Philippines. On May 15, 2006, the United States announced that Libya would be removed from the list after a 45-day wait period. Secretary of State Condoleezza Rice explained that this was due to "...Libya's continued commitment to its renunciation of terrorism".

Former South Yemen (1979–1990) 
South Yemen was added to the list on December 29, 1979. It had been branded a sponsor of terrorism due to its support for several left-wing terrorist groups.

The country was dropped from the list in 1990 after it merged with the Yemen Arab Republic (North Yemen) on May 22, 1990, to become the new Republic of Yemen.

Sudan (1993–2020) 
Sudan was added to the list on August 12, 1993. American officials alleged that Sudan harbored members of the Abu Nidal Organization, Hezbollah, and Islamic Jihad.

In October 2020, President Donald Trump announced that the United States would remove Sudan from the list following the ousting and subsequent removal of President Omar Al-Bashir, and an agreement with the new transitional government to pay $335 million in compensation to the families of victims of the 1998 United States embassy bombings.

On December 14, 2020, the United States officially removed Sudan from the list.

Sanctions
The sanctions which the US imposes on countries on the list are:
 A ban on arms-related exports and sales.
 Controls over exports of dual-use items, requiring 30-day Congressional notification for goods or services that could significantly enhance the terrorist-list country's military capability or ability to support terrorism.
 Prohibitions on economic assistance.
 Imposition of miscellaneous financial and other restrictions, including:
Requiring the United States to oppose loans by the World Bank and other international financial institutions;
Lifting diplomatic immunity to allow families of terrorist victims to file civil lawsuits in U.S. courts;
Denying companies and individuals tax credits for income earned in terrorist-listed countries;
Denial of duty-free treatment of goods exported to the United States;
Authority to prohibit any U.S. citizen from engaging in a financial transaction with a terrorist-list government without a Treasury Department license; and
Prohibition of Defense Department contracts above $100,000 with companies controlled by terrorist-list states.
From January 2016, some of the countries listed were included in a separate exclusion the Visa Waiver Program. The (VWP) does not apply where a person has previously traveled to these countries on or after 1 March 2011 or for those who remain nationals of those countries in addition to the nationality that would otherwise entitle them to a visa waiver. Instead, they are now required to go through the process to obtain a visa. Certain categories such as diplomats, military, journalists, humanitarian workers or legitimate businessmen may have their visa requirement waived by the Secretary of Homeland Security.
Under the Trump administration, citizens of these countries faced partial entry restrictions to the United States under Presidential Proclamation 9645 of the Executive Order 13780. The order was in force from 2017 until its revocation in 2021.
Entry of all North Korean and Syrian nationals into the United States as immigrant and non-immigrant are currently suspended.
Entry of all Iranian nationals into the United States as immigrant and non-immigrant are currently suspended unless they have valid student visas (F, M-1, and M-2 visas) or exchange visitor visas (J-1 and J-2 visas), but may be subject to enhanced screening.
Travel restrictions imposed by the United States on citizens of Sudan were removed under Presidential Proclamation 9645.
Unlike the previous executive order, these restrictions are conditional and can be lifted if those countries meet the required security standards set up by the United States.

Criticism
Michael F. Oppenheimer, professor at New York University's Center for Global Affairs, considers the State Sponsors of Terrorism list as a "negotiating tool" that, in the case of Iran, serves as a "bargaining chip," where the United States would "take them off as part of process of alleviating sanctions against Iran in exchange for what we're asking for in the nuclear agenda." Oppenheimer continues:
Countries that wind up on that list are countries we don't like [...] Other countries and outside powers support terrorism, and objectively speaking are terrorists, and the ones we don't like are on the list, and the ones we're allied with are not on the list. It's all about double standards.

Linguist and political activist Noam Chomsky wrote that Iraq was removed from the list in 1982 "in order to permit the US to join the UK and others in providing badly needed aid for Saddam Hussein, continuing without concern after he carried out his most horrifying crimes." About Syria being in the list, Chomsky writes:
Chomsky continued:
Returning to Iraq, when Saddam was removed from the list of states supporting terrorism, Cuba was added to replace it, perhaps in recognition of the sharp escalation in international terrorist attacks against Cuba in the late 1970s, including the bombing of a Cubana airliner killing 73 people and many other atrocities. These were mostly planned and implemented in the US [...] Washington was officially condemning the terrorist acts while harbouring and protecting the terrorist cells on US soil in violation of US law.

David Gewirtz, executive director of the US Strategic Perspective Initiative and a cyber-warfare adviser for the International Association of Counterterrorism & Security Professionals writes:

Terrorist safe havens
The U.S. Country Reports on Terrorism also describes "Terrorist safe havens" which "described in this report include ungoverned, under-governed, or ill-governed physical areas where terrorists are able to organize, plan, raise funds, communicate, recruit, train, transit, and operate in relative security because of inadequate governance capacity, political will, or both". In the U.S. Annual report published in July 2017, which was mandated by the Congress titled "Country Report on Terrorism", the State Department listed numerous regions as "Terrorist safe havens."

In Africa, Somalia was listed as a country where Al-Shabaab finds safe haven, particularly in the Jubba River valley. The poorly-governed regions in the Trans-Sahara, in particular in Mali, is where terrorist groups have used territory to "organize, plan, raise funds, communicate, recruit, train, and operate in relative security." In Libya, porous borders and poorly cohesive security forces along with a large area of ungoverned territory have allowed for a "permissive environment" in which several terrorist groups can operate, such as Ansar al-Sharia, Al-Qaeda in the Islamic Maghreb, Al-Mourabitoun, and Islamic State of Iraq and the Levant can operate.

In the Middle East, parts of the Sinai Peninsula of Egypt, operations against Islamic State of Iraq and the Levant – Sinai Province have made the northern part of the peninsula off-limits to tourists. In southern Lebanon, the government was reported not be in control off "all regions" of the country, nor its borders with Israel and Syria, creating a space for Hezbollah to operate with "relative impunity," and the government has been noted to have made no attempt to disarm the group. Other groups such as the Al-Nusra Front and Islamic State of Iraq and the Levant have been noted to operate in mountainous regions of the country. In Yemen, numerous groups such as Al-Qaeda in the Arabian Peninsula, ISIL operate due to a "political and security vacuum," and have been able to exploit the country's sectarian divide to gain support among Sunnis.

In South-East Asia, several islands in the Sulawesi Sea and Sulu Archipelago, difficult to govern lands have provided terrorist groups the ability to operate under the cover of "traditional smuggling and piracy groups." Abu Sayyaf, Jemaah Islamiyah, and the Bangsamoro Islamic Freedom Fighters also operate in difficult to govern regions on the Mindanao island in the Philippines.

In South Asia, the border regions of Afghanistan and Pakistan are labeled "ungoverned areas" which terrorists have been able to exploit in order to conduct terrorist activities in both countries. The State Department stated that terror groups like the LeT and JeM continue to operate, train, organize, and fundraise openly inside Pakistan in 2016. Though the LeT is officially banned in Pakistan, its Jama'at-ud-Da'wah and Falah-e-Insaniat wings are not, although the JuD is "under observation" in accordance with the country's Schedule Two of the Anti-Terrorism Act.

In the Western hemisphere, Colombia's dense rainforests and weak government presence along its international borders were noted to have allowed safe havens for terrorist groups such as the FARC to operate. "Credible reports" have stated that neighboring Venezuela has maintained a "permissive environment" for the activities of "known terrorist groups." In particular, they blame Nicolás Maduro and associates of using "criminal activities" to foster a "permissive environment" for known terrorist groups, including FARC, Hezbollah, and the National Liberation Army.

See also
 Axis of evil
 Executive Order 13769 and 13780
 Iran and state-sponsored terrorism
 Rogue state
 State-sponsored terrorism
 United States and state-sponsored terrorism
 United States sanctions
 United States Department of State list of Foreign Terrorist Organizations

References

 State Department: State Sponsors of Terrorism
 

United States Department of State
USA list
International terrorism
United States foreign policy
War on terror
Cuba–United States relations
Libya–United States relations
Iran–United States relations
Iraq–United States relations
North Korea–United States relations
South Yemen–United States relations
Sudan–United States relations
Syria–United States relations